Pune Via Bihar (Marathi: पुणे व्हाया बिहार) was released on 31 January 2014, is an Indian Marathi-language film. It is directed by Sachin Goswami and produced by Atul Maru and Ketan Maru.

Cast 
 Bharat Jadhav as Nishikant Nimbalkar
 Umesh Kamat as Abhijeet Bhosle
 Mrunmayee Deshpande as Tara Yadav
 Sunil Kumar as Baldev
 Arun Nalavade
 Bhalchandra Kadam

Soundtrack

References

2014 films
2010s Marathi-language films